MV Kaitaki is a roll-on/roll-off ferry built in 1995. It previously operated under the names, Isle of Innisfree, then Pride of Cherbourg, Stena Challenger and Challenger. As of 2008, MV Kaitaki was the largest ferry operating the Interislander service between the North and South Islands of New Zealand having taken her latest name in 2007. KiwiRail, the operator of the Interislander service, bought the Kaitaki in 2017.

History

The ship was built at Van der Giessen de Noord shipyard in the Netherlands, and was launched in 1995 as the Isle of Innisfree for the Irish Ferries route between Holyhead and Dublin. Subsequently she served on the Pembroke Dock – Rosslare route between 1997 and 2001.

In 2002 the Isle of Innisfree was chartered by P&O Portsmouth and was sent to Falmouth in July of that year for refit. She emerged as Pride of Cherbourg, the third ship to carry this name. Pride of Cherbourg entered service in September 2002.

Pride of Cherbourgs last crossing for P&O was on 14 January 2005, from Cherbourg to Portsmouth. P&O subchartered her to Stena Roroand she sailed for Gdańsk, where all her exterior P&O branding was removed and she was renamed Stena Challenger. The Stena Challenger sailed on Stena Line's Karlskrona—Gdynia service from February until June 2005. 

After completing her service with Stena Line she was sub-chartered again, to KiwiRail. Before leaving for New Zealand her name was shortened to Challenger, with its Māori translation, Kaitaki, also appearing on its bow, being used for marketing purposes (the other two Interislander ferries at the time, Arahura and Aratere, had Māori names). In April 2007 the ship was renamed Kaitaki. Like the Kaiarahi she is an Interislander ferry without a rail deck for the transport of railway wagons.

In 2009, it was announced that the initial five-year lease would be extended. The lease has been renewed again on 16 April 2013 until 2017 with the option to extend another three years afterwards. In May 2017, KiwiRail purchased the Kaitaki outright from the Irish Continental Group.

On the evening of 28 January 2023, the Kaitaki suffered an incident where she lost power (including propulsion) around 5pm for several hours. However, the ship managed to anchor itself safely, did not encounter any further danger, and power was eventually restored to the vessel later that night. The Transport Accident Investigation Commission of New Zealand stated that an investigation would be launched, due to the incident's impact on transportation safety and to make recommendations to prevent future incidents.

References

External links

 Kaitaki at the Interislander website
 Stena Roro – Kaitaki

Cook Strait ferries
1995 ships
Ships built in Rotterdam